123 Squadron may refer to:

 No. 123 Squadron RCAF, Canada
 123 Squadron (Israel)
 123 Squadron, Republic of Singapore Air Force, see list of Republic of Singapore Air Force squadrons

 No. 123 Squadron RAF, United Kingdom
 123d Fighter Squadron, United States Air Force
 123rd Special Tactics Squadron, United States Air Force
 VAH-123, United States Navy
 VAW-123, United States Navy
 VP-123, United States Navy
 VMF-123, United States Marine Corps